Matterdale is a civil parish in the Eden District, Cumbria, England.  It contains 33 listed buildings that are recorded in the National Heritage List for England.  Of these, three are listed at Grade II*, the middle of the three grades, and the others are at Grade II, the lowest grade.  The parish is in the Lake District National Park.  It contains the settlements of Watermillock, Matterdale End, Wreay, Dockray, and Hutton, and apart from that it is mainly rural comprising countryside, moorland and fells.

Most of the listed buildings are houses and associated structures, farmhouses and farm buildings.  The other listed buildings are churches, memorials in a churchyard, a sundial, a bridge, a hotel, an outward bound school, a milepost, and a mill.


Key

Buildings

References

Citations

Sources

Lists of listed buildings in Cumbria